Dragan Tarlać (born May 9, 1973) is a retired Serbian professional basketball player. He also holds Greek citizenship.

Professional career

Europe
After starting his senior pro career with his hometown club KK Vojvodina, he transferred to Crvena zvezda from Belgrade. He stayed there for two seasons, which was enough for Olympiacos to notice his talent and offer him a move to Piraeus.

With Olympiacos, he won 5 Greek League championships (1992–93, 1993–94, 1994–95, 1995–96, 1996–97), 2 Greek Cups (1993–94, 1996–97) the 1996-97 EuroLeague championship, and the Triple Crown (1996–97). He was one of the best centers that has ever played for Olympiacos.

NBA
Tarlać was selected by the NBA club the Chicago Bulls in the 1995 NBA draft. He finally left Greece to go play in the NBA in the summer of 2000, when he took off for the United States to play with the Chicago Bulls. His career in the NBA was not particularly successful, and he returned to Europe the following off-season, after winning the FIBA EuroBasket 2001 with the senior Yugoslavian national team.

Back to Europe
After leaving the NBA, and returning to Europe, Tarlać then spent his next two seasons with the Spanish League club Real Madrid, before finishing up his career with the Russian League club CSKA Moscow.

National team career
It was with Olympiacos, that Tarlać made a name for himself, earning a call up to the senior FR Yugoslavia national squad (Serbia-Montenegro). For a while, there was a controversy over his national team status, because he took Greek nationality (under the name Dragan Konstantinidis) like many other Serbian players of the time did in the 1990s.

The issue was finally straightened out, and he was allowed to compete for the senior Serbo-Montenegrin national basketball team at the FIBA EuroBasket 1999 in France, along with his fellow countrymen Peja Stojaković and Milan Gurović, who were also in the same situation, having also taken Greek citizenship. His team won the bronze medal at the tournament. He also won the gold medal at the FIBA EuroBasket 2001 with his national team.

NBA career statistics

Regular season

|-
| align="left" | 2000–01
| align="left" | Chicago
| 43 || 12 || 13.9 || .394 || .000 || .758 || 2.8 || .7 || .2 || .4 || 2.4
|-
| align="left" | Career
| align="left" | 
| 43 || 12 || 13.9 || .394 || .000 || .758 || 2.8 || .7 || .2 || .4 || 2.4

Personal life 
His son, Luka (born 2002) is a basketball player, also. Luka was a member of the Serbia national under-16 team at the 2018 FIBA Europe Under-16 Championship.

See also 
 List of Serbian NBA players

References

External links
NBA.com profile
Euroleague.net profile
FIBA Euroleague profile
FIBA.com profile
Spanish League profile 

1973 births
Living people
Basketball players at the 2000 Summer Olympics
Centers (basketball)
Chicago Bulls draft picks
Chicago Bulls players
FIBA EuroBasket-winning players
Greek Basket League players
Greek expatriate basketball people in Spain
Greek expatriate basketball people in the United States
Greek men's basketball players
Greek people of Serbian descent
KK Crvena Zvezda executives
KK Crvena zvezda players
KK Vojvodina players
Liga ACB players
National Basketball Association players from Serbia
Naturalized citizens of Greece
Olympiacos B.C. players
Olympic basketball players of Yugoslavia
PBC CSKA Moscow players
Real Madrid Baloncesto players
Serbian expatriate basketball people in Greece
Serbian expatriate basketball people in Russia
Serbian expatriate basketball people in Spain
Serbian expatriate basketball people in the United States
Serbian men's basketball players
Basketball players from Novi Sad
Yugoslav men's basketball players